Peter Mac Manu (born 1953) is a Ghanaian politician. He was the National Chairman of the New Patriotic Party from December 2005 to February 2010.He was made the Campaign manager for the Presidential and Parliamentary Elections which was held in 2016.

Mac Manu has a bachelor's degree in business administration from the School of Administration of the University of Ghana. He later worked as a businessman and entrepreneur, and founded and managed several companies. Before being elected National Chairman, Mac Manu served as chairman of the NPP in Ghana's Western Region.

Peter Mac Manu is married and has six children.

References

1953 births
Living people
New Patriotic Party politicians
Kumasi Academy alumni